Jaynagar–Udhna Antyodaya Express is an Express train belonging to East Central Railway zone that runs between  and  . It is currently being operated with 15563/15564 train numbers on a weekly basis.

Traction
Jaynagar to Itarsi WDP-4D of Samastipur' diesel loco shed and Itarsi to Udhna WAP-5 of Vadodara electric loco shed.

Service 

The 15563/Jaynagar–Udhna Antyodaya Express has an average speed of 51 km/hr and covers 1862 km in 36h 15m. The 15564/Udhna–Jaynagar Antyodaya Express has an average speed of  49 km/hr and covers 1862 km in 37h 50m.

Coach composition 

The trains is completely general coaches trains designed by Indian Railways with features of LED screen display to show information about stations, train speed etc. Vending machines for water. Bio toilets in compartments as well as CCTV cameras and mobile charging points and toilet occupancy indicators.

Route & halts

See also 

 Antyodaya Express
 Jaynagar railway station
 Udhna Junction railway station
 Bandra Terminus–Gorakhpur Antyodaya Express

Notes

References

External links
 15563/Jaynagar - Udhna Antyodaya Express India Rail Info
 15564/Udhna - Jaynagar Antyodaya Express India Rail Info

Antyodaya Express trains
Rail transport in Gujarat
Rail transport in Maharashtra
Rail transport in Madhya Pradesh
Rail transport in Uttar Pradesh
Rail transport in Bihar
Transport in Surat
Transport in Jainagar
Railway services introduced in 2017